The 2018 USA Indoor Track and Field Championships were held at the Albuquerque Convention Center in Albuquerque, New Mexico. Organized by USA Track and Field (USATF), the three-day competition took place from February 16 to February 18 and served as the national championships in indoor track and field for the United States.  All marks in the competition are considered at altitude. The meet serves for the selection of American representatives at the 2018 IAAF World Indoor Championships held in Birmingham March 1 to March 4.

Schedule

Men

Women

Qualification

The 2018 USA Outdoor Track and Field Championships serve as the qualification meet for United States representatives in international competitions, including the 2018 IAAF World Indoor Championships. In order to be entered, athletes need to achieve a qualifying standard mark and place in the top 2 in their event and top 12 in the world. The United States team, as managed by USATF, can also bring a qualified back up athlete in case one of the team members is unable to perform.

Additionally, defending World Champions received byes into the World Championships. The athletes eligible for a bye are:

Defending World Champions
 Michelle Carter - Shot Put
 Brittney Reese - Long Jump
 Barbara Pierre - 60 m
 Nia Ali - 60 m hurdles
 Vashti Cunningham - High Jump
 Jenn Suhr - Pole Vault
 Trayvon Bromell - 60 m
 Boris Berian - 800 meters
 Matthew Centrowitz - 1500 meters
 Marquis Dendy - long jump
 Ashton Eaton - Heptathlon (retired)

References

External links
 2018 USA Indoor Track & Field Championships Results - 2/16/2018 to 2/18/2018 Albuquerque Convention Center usatf.org
 Complete Results
 2018 USATF Indoor Track and Field Championships Home Page

External links
Official USATF website

2017
Track and field indoor
USA Indoor Track and Field Championships
USA Indoor Track and Field Championships
Sports in Albuquerque, New Mexico
Track and field in New Mexico
Events in Albuquerque, New Mexico